ACTC may refer to:

ACTC1
Stock symbol for Advanced Cell Technology
All Ceylon Tamil Congress, a Sri Lankan political party representing the Sri Lankan Tamil ethnic minority
Andhra Christian Theological College, Hyderabad, India
Apple Certified Technical Coordinator
Ashland Community and Technical College, Kentucky, US
Asociación Corredores de Turismo Carretera, motorsport governing body
Associated Colleges of the Twin Cities 5 liberal arts colleges in Minneapolis-Saint Paul, Minnesota
Association for Core Texts and Courses
Australian Counter-Terrorism Centre